Abeysiri Narayana Susantha Chandramali Wanigaratne (born February 21, 1964 as සුසන්තා චන්ද්‍රමාලි) [Sinhala]), popularly as Susantha Chandramali, is an actress in Sri Lankan cinema, theater and television. She is best known for the dramatic roles in Charulatha, Sujatha and Kande Gedara.

Personal life
Susantha Chandramali was born on 21 February 1964 in Mulkirigala, Hambantota.

She is married to Kumaru Liyanage. The wedding was celebrated on 12 March 1991. The couple has one daughter, Thisuri Yuwanika Madduma Liyanage. She is also a popular teledrama and cinema actress, who won best actress award in multiple times. Thisuri made her acting debut with her mother in Punchi Kumarige Naththala (1994) when she was just 3 years old. Then she had the chance to act in Sudath Devapriya's Udu Gang Yamaya (2001). Thisuri is married to longtime partner, Suraj Wijesinghe.

In 2020, she was diagnosed with a cancer at first stage. She received treatments continuously to reduce the cancer growth.

Acting career
Her maiden cinematic experience came through a supportive role in 2000 blockbuster film Saroja, directed by Somaratne Dissanayake. Some of her popular films are Jaya Pita Jaya, Ran Kevita and Nidahase Piya DS.

Selected television serials

 Ahas
 Anantha
 Ayomi (2021) 
 Chakrandi
 Charulatha
 Denuwara Manike 
 Ehipillamak Yata  
 Gamane Yaa
 Ganga Saha Nissanka
 Girikula
 Hima Varusa 
 Ihirunu Kiri
 Kadathira
 Kadupul Mal
 Kande Gedara
 Manokaya
 Maya Mansala
 Meda Gedara
 Miringu Sayura
 Muthu Palasa
 Pawani
 Pini Wessak
 Raja Varama 
 Rajini
 Ranga Soba 
 Samanala Wasanthaya
 Samanala Yaya 
 Sanda Ginigath Rathriya 
 Sanda Gomman Re
 Sanda Numba Nam
 Santhrase
 Sasara Bendi Bemi 
 Sihina Cindrella
 Sivusiya Gawwa
 Sudu Hamine
 Sujatha
 Suwanda Yahaluwo
 Thimira Gira
 Visirunu Renu 
 Wanawadule Wasanthaya
 Wasanthaya Aran Evith 
 Wasuli Kanda
 Weda Mahaththaya

Beyond acting
In 2009, Chandramali contested from United People's Freedom Alliance for the Southern provincial council. However, she was unable to selected for the council.

Filmography

References

External links
  Grand Alliance finalised as unp remains unsure of Pres. Poll
 Faces no problem for Ruhunu voters – Susil
 Chat With Susantha Chandramali And Thisuri Yuwanika
 Chat with Susantha Chandramali

Living people
Sri Lankan film actresses
1964 births